Brains (S. A. Brain & Company Ltd.) is a regional brewery based in Cardiff, Wales. It was founded in 1882 by Samuel Arthur Brain. The company controls more than 250 pubs in South Wales (particularly in Cardiff), Mid Wales and the West Country. The company took over Crown Buckley Brewery in Llanelli in 1997 and Hancock's Brewery in 1999. In 2000, Brains moved to the former Hancock's Brewery just south of Cardiff Central railway station. The Old Brewery, in Cardiff city centre, has been developed into a modern bar and restaurant complex.

The company produces a range of beers under the Brains, Buckley's and Hancock's names. As part of their marketing strategy, Brains use shirt sponsorship for the Wales national rugby union team and the Crusaders Rugby League team.

History

Samuel Arthur Brain was born in 1850 and brought up in Bristol, England, before moving to Cardiff to train as a brewer. A talented brewer, he quickly rose to become Manager of the Phoenix Brewery in Working Street. In 1872 he married a girl whose father owned Thomas's brewery in St Mary Street, Cardiff. In 1882 the Thomas brothers sold the Old Brewery in Cardiff in order to pay debts. Samuel Arthur and his uncle Joseph Benjamin Brain, Chairman of the West of England Bank, founded their business by buying the brewery from the Thomas brothers. Part of the building dated from 1713 and it had been a brewery since at least 1822.

In 1882 the brewery produced 100 barrels of beer a week and operated 11 pubs. By 1900 this had grown to 1,000 barrels of beer a week, supplying 80 of their public houses. The company became a limited company, S A Brain & Co Ltd, in April 1897 and purchased the business for £350,000.
Interior of the Golden Cross, Cardiff (8).jpg
Brains expanded the Old Brewery was expanded in 1914 by having a new brewery built in St Mary Street.

In 1997 Brains took over Crown Buckley in Llanelli. It closed Crown Buckley's brewery and transferred production to Cardiff. In 1999 Brains bought the former Hancock's Brewery just south of Cardiff Central railway station. In 2000 it moved production there, and in 2003 the Old Brewery was redeveloped as a bar and restaurant complex.

Until September 2009 the multi-millionaire chairman of the company was Chris Brain. The chairman is now John Rhys, the great-great-grandson of company founder Samuel Arthur Brain.

In March 2019 the new Dragon Brewery, at the Pacific Business Park in Tremorfa, was opened by Prince William, Duke of Cambridge, who was taken on a tour of the new facility by head brewer Bill Dobson.

In December 2020, Brains handed over the running of its 156 pubs via a 25-year lease-back deal to Marston's Ninety-nine Brains pubs were later put up for sale.

Coffee#1
In September 2011 the company diversified into coffee shops, buying the Cardiff-based coffee house chain, Coffee#1. In mid-2018, SA Brain announced that they wished to sell a majority stake in Coffee#1, after a strategic review. In January 2019, Caffè Nero bought a 70% stake in the business, which at that time had 92 outlets.

Beer brands

Brains brand
Brains SA, the company's flagship brand, is a light-coloured malty best bitter which is colloquially known as "Skull Attack". Its formulation has undergone several revisions since the beer was launched in the early 20th century; the most recent revision was launched in early 2006 and increases the quantity of hops in the brew.

Brains Dark is a dark mild ale with an emphasis on roasted malts. There is also a 'smooth' variant.

Brains Bitter is the brewery's standard bitter and the most commonly available in Cardiff. Many Brains' pubs serve only bitter from a cask. When served pasteurised and nitrogenated it is termed Brains Smooth.

Brains IPA, an unusually malty example of the India Pale Ale style, is usually seen on cask only in the valleys outside Cardiff, although some pubs stock it as keg beer or in bottles in Cardiff proper.

SA Gold, the newest addition to the line, is – according to a release note sent out to Brains pubs in early 2006 – Brains' attempts to branch out into both the English and youth markets, areas in which Brains is visibly struggling. Its official launch was June 2006, but many houses retired it in favour of the bi-monthly guest ale rotation. The beer is hopped with Cascade, Target and Styrian Golding hops.

45 was a keg beer at 4.5% ABV. It was launched in 2006 in Cardiff as a competitor to strong lagers such as Stella Artois. In March 2007, the recipe was radically altered from the original used in the January launch after slow market growth and poor in-house response. It was discontinued in 2011.

The Rev. James is a 4.5% ABV dark best bitter carried over from the Buckley's range after the two breweries merged.

Brains Black is a 4.1% ABV stout launched on St David's Day 2010.

Buckley's brand
Brains bought the Llanelli-based Crown Buckley in 1998. It continues to brew three Buckley's beers, all at its Cardiff brewery: Buckley's Bitter, Buckley's IPA and Reverend James best bitter.

Hancock's brand
Hancocks HB is a 3.6% session bitter first brewed by Hancock's brewery. Formerly Wales' biggest brewer, the brewery was founded by William Hancock (father of Frank, Froude and William Hancock) and bought by Bass in 1968. Brains bought Hancock's in 1999, but initially Bass kept the rights to the brands. Production later came back to Cardiff.

Seasonal beers
Seasonal beers' include St David's Ale, which is brewed to celebrate St David's Day and is available in February and March. Taff End is available in June and July and celebrates sponsorship of the Glamorgan County Cricket Club. Brains' Bread of Heaven, named after a traditional Welsh rugby anthem, was launched in 2005 in commemoration of the sponsorship, and is mostly sold during the Six Nations Championship and autumn internationals.Hen Wlad Fy Nhadau''' (Land Of My Fathers) was launched in 2006 to commemorate the 150th anniversary of the Welsh national anthem. It is a golden ale brewed with Welsh honey.

Marketing

Brains sponsored a number of railway bridges over roads in Cardiff to have its advertising slogans painted on them. They include "It's Brains you want!" in Clare Road and Leckwith Road and "People who know beer... have Brains"'' in Penarth Road.

Brains was the shirt sponsor for the Wales national rugby union team from 2004 until 2010. As French law forbids alcohol sponsorship logos from appearing on rugby jerseys, when the team played in France the branding was changed. In 2005, "Brains" was replaced with "Brawn", in 2007 it was changed to "Brawn Again", and in 2009 it was replaced with "Try Essai", a pun on the invitation to "try SA".

The Old Brewery Quarter

The development has attracted a range of bar and restaurant operators including Chiquito, La Tasca, Lava Lounge, Nando's, Pancake House, Starbucks, Thai Edge and SA Brains own flagship venue, the Yard Bar and Kitchen.

References

External links

 Official website

Breweries in Wales
Companies based in Cardiff
British companies established in 1882
Welsh brands
Food and drink companies established in 1882
1882 establishments in Wales